Astragalus inversus is a species of milkvetch known by the common name Susanville milkvetch.

It grows in southern Cascade Range Yellow pine forests and dry Great Basin Sagebrush scrub habitats.

Description
Astragalus inversus is a perennial herb with slender, wiry, mostly leafless stems growing 20 to 50 centimeters long. They grow upright or form a spreading clump.  The leaves are up to 12 centimeters long and are made up of a few small, widely spaced narrow leaflets.

The inflorescence is a loose array of 5 to 12 pale to reddish pink flowers, sometimes tinted with yellow. Each flower is about a centimeter long.

The fruit is a hanging legume pod 2 to 3.5 centimeters long, narrow and flat in shape and drying to a hairy, papery texture.

See also
 List of plants on the Modoc National Forest

References

External links
 CalFlora database: Astragalus inversus (Susanville milk vetch)
Jepson Manual Treatment: Astragalus inversus
USDA Plants Profile: Astragalus inversus (Susanville milkvetch)
Astragalus inversus — U.C. Photo gallery

inversus
Endemic flora of California
Flora of the Cascade Range
Flora of the Great Basin
~
~
~
Natural history of Lassen County, California
Natural history of Modoc County, California
Natural history of Shasta County, California
Natural history of Siskiyou County, California
Flora without expected TNC conservation status